Cleveland is a town in Blount County, Alabama, United States. At the 2020 census, the population was 1,245.

History

Cleveland was settled in the 1820s, and had grown into a small community by the early 1880s.  It was initially known as Dry Creek Crossroads, and afterward as Blackwood's Crossroads, after local entrepreneur John Blackwood.  When a post office was established in the community, it was named in honor of President Grover Cleveland.  The town incorporated in 1964.

Geography
Cleveland is located in central Blount County at 33°59'31.326" North, 86°34'33.823" West (33.992035, -86.576062). The Locust Fork of the Black Warrior River flows past the northwest side of the town. The National Register-listed Swann Covered Bridge, which spans the river, lies just west of Cleveland. U.S. Route 231 intersects Alabama State Route 79 north of the center of town. Route 231 leads southeast  to Oneonta, the county seat, and north  to Huntsville. Route 79 leads northeast  to Guntersville and southwest  to Birmingham.

Demographics

2020 census

As of the 2020 United States census, there were 1,245 people, 522 households, and 360 families residing in the town.

2010 census
As of the census of 2010, there were 1,303 people, 464 households, and 358 families residing in the town. The racial makeup of the town was 89.2% White, 0.3% Black or African American, 0.2% Native American, 8.6% from other races, and 1.4% from two or more races. 18.4% of the population were Hispanic or Latino of any race.

There were 464 households, out of which 35.6% had children under the age of 18 living with them, 62.5% were married couples living together, 10.1% had a female householder with no husband present, and 22.8% were non-families. 20.5% of all households were made up of individuals, and 11.5% had someone living alone who was 65 years of age or older. The average household size was 2.79 and the average family size was 3.23.

In the town, the population was spread out, with 26.0% under the age of 18, 8.4% from 18 to 24, 28.0% from 25 to 44, 25.1% from 45 to 64, and 13.7% who were 65 years of age or older. The median age was 36.8 years. For every 100 females, there were 94.2 males. For every 100 females age 18 and over, there were 105.5 males.

The median income for a household in the town was $46,786, and the median income for a family was $53,818. Males had a median income of $37,344 versus $25,313 for females. The per capita income for the town was $18,250. About 11.1% of families and 15.5% of the population were below the poverty line, including 27.6% of those under age 18 and 12.7% of those age 65 or over.

References

External links

 Town of Cleveland official website

Towns in Blount County, Alabama
Towns in Alabama
Birmingham metropolitan area, Alabama